Jon Gleed (born January 3, 1984) is a Canadian retired professional ice hockey defenceman. Gleed was selected by the Montreal Canadiens in the seventh round (212th overall) of the 2004 NHL Entry Draft.

Awards and honours

References

Career statistics

External links

1984 births
Living people
Belfast Giants players
Bridgeport Sound Tigers players
Canadian ice hockey defencemen
Cincinnati Cyclones (ECHL) players
Hamilton Bulldogs (AHL) players
Ice hockey people from Ontario
Montreal Canadiens draft picks
Sportspeople from Milton, Ontario
Utah Grizzlies (ECHL) players
Cornell Big Red men's ice hockey players
Canadian expatriate ice hockey players in the United States
Canadian expatriate ice hockey players in Northern Ireland